The 2017 Moselle Open was a tennis tournament held in Metz, France and played on indoor hard courts. It was the 15th edition of the Moselle Open, and part of the ATP World Tour 250 series of the 2017 ATP World Tour. It was held at the Arènes de Metz from 18 September to 24 September 2017. Unseeded Peter Gojowczyk, who entered the main draw as a qualifier, won the singles title.

Singles main-draw entrants

Seeds

 1 Rankings are as of September 11, 2017.

Other entrants 
The following players received wild cards into the singles main draw:
  Dustin Brown
  Nicolas Mahut
  Paul-Henri Mathieu

The following players received entry from the singles qualifying draw:
  Simone Bolelli 
  Peter Gojowczyk 
  Vincent Millot 
  Stefanos Tsitsipas

The following players received entry as lucky losers:
  Yannick Maden
  Kenny de Schepper

Withdrawals
Before the tournament
  Pablo Carreño Busta →replaced by  Kenny de Schepper
  Blaž Kavčič →replaced by  Henri Laaksonen
  Florian Mayer →replaced by  Yannick Maden
  Dudi Sela →replaced by  Marcel Granollers

Retirements
  Mischa Zverev

Doubles main-draw entrants

Seeds 

 Rankings are as of September 11, 2017

Other entrants 
The following pairs received wildcards into the doubles main draw:
  Romain Arneodo /  Hugo Nys
  Paul-Henri Mathieu /  Benoît Paire

Withdrawals 
Before the tournament
  Pierre-Hugues Herbert

Finals

Singles 

  Peter Gojowczyk defeated  Benoît Paire, 7–5, 6–2.

Doubles 

  Julien Benneteau /  Édouard Roger-Vasselin defeated  Wesley Koolhof /  Artem Sitak, 7–5, 6–3.

References

External links
 Official website